Darga is a musical group based in Casablanca, Morocco founded in 2001 by students of an Art school. They play Gnawa music and fusions of traditional music with Western styles.

References

Official site
 Official website

Moroccan reggae musical groups
Musical groups established in 2001
Casablanca